Bill Atkinson (born March 17, 1951) is an American computer engineer and photographer.  Atkinson worked at Apple Computer from 1978 to 1990.

Atkinson was the principal designer and developer of the graphical user interface (GUI) of the Apple Lisa and, later, one of the first thirty members of the original Apple Macintosh development team, and was the creator of the MacPaint application. He also designed and implemented QuickDraw, the fundamental toolbox that the Lisa and Macintosh used for graphics. QuickDraw's performance was essential for the success of the Macintosh GUI. He also was one of the main designers of the Lisa and Macintosh user interfaces. Atkinson also conceived, designed and implemented HyperCard, an early and influential hypermedia system. HyperCard put the power of computer programming and database design into the hands of nonprogrammers. In 1994, Atkinson received the EFF Pioneer Award for his contributions.

Education
He received his undergraduate degree from the University of California, San Diego, where Apple Macintosh developer Jef Raskin was one of his professors. Atkinson continued his studies as a graduate student in neurochemistry at the University of Washington. Raskin invited Atkinson to visit him at Apple Computer; Steve Jobs persuaded him to join the company immediately as employee No. 51, and Atkinson never finished his PhD.

Career 
Around 1990, General Magic's founding, with Bill Atkinson as one of the three cofounders, met the following press in Byte magazine:
The obstacles to General Magic's success may appear daunting, but General Magic is not your typical start-up company. Its partners include some of the biggest players in the worlds of computing, communications, and consumer electronics, and it's loaded with top-notch engineers who have been given a clean slate to reinvent traditional approaches to ubiquitous worldwide communications.

In 2007, Atkinson began working as an outside developer with Numenta, a startup working on computer intelligence. On his work there Atkinson said, "what Numenta is doing is more fundamentally important to society than the personal computer and the rise of the Internet."

Currently, Atkinson has combined his passion for computer programming with his love of nature photography to create art images. He takes close-up photographs of stones that have been cut and polished. His works are highly regarded for their resemblance to miniature landscapes which are hidden within the stones. Atkinson's 2004 book Within the Stone features a collection of his close-up photographs. The highly intricate and detailed images he creates are made possible by the accuracy and creative control of the digital printing process that he helped create.

Some of Atkinson's noteworthy contributions to the field of computing include:
 Macintosh QuickDraw and Lisa LisaGraf
 Atkinson independently discovered the midpoint circle algorithm for fast drawing of circles by using the sum of consecutive odd numbers.
 Marching ants
 The double-click
 Menu bar
 The selection lasso
 FatBits
 MacPaint
 HyperCard
 Atkinson dithering
 Bill Atkinson PhotoCard

Atkinson now works as a nature photographer. Actor Nelson Franklin portrayed him in the 2013 film Jobs.

References

External links
 

1951 births
American photographers
Apple Inc. employees
Apple Fellows
Living people
University of California, San Diego alumni
Place of birth missing (living people)
University of Washington alumni
Macintosh operating systems people
Scientists from the San Francisco Bay Area